Veleda or Velleda may refer to:
 Veleda, a priestess and prophet of the Germanic tribe of the Bructeri
 Velléda, a cantata by Paul Dukas
 Velleda (beetle), a genus of beetles in the family Cerambycidae
 126 Velleda, an asteroid
 Velleda, a work by Benedikte Naubert
 Velleda, a registered trademark of Société Bic